Fotis Outsikas (born 26 May 1957) is a Greek former professional footballer who played as left midfielder.

Club career
Outsikas first played football at Pamisos Messini, where he made his debut at the age of just 14 with the men's team in the local championship. In 1973 he was transferred to AEK Athens to join their academies at the recommendation of Andreas Stamatiadis, at the age of just 16 as a great hope for the future, since he was one of the few footballers at that time with speed and a remarkable pass. He was promoted to the first team under František Fadrhonc, but the players of the time at AEK made very difficult for young Outsikas to earn a place in the team's squad. He was a part of the squad that reached to the semi-finals of the UEFA Cup in the 1977. With the yellow-blacks, he won 2 consecutive Championships, a Greek Cup including a domestic double in 1978.

In the summer of 1978 he was released from AEK due to a serious injury he suffered and signed at Acharnaikos, where he played for one year and then at Panachaiki. In 1981 he signed with Diagoras and in the summer of 1982 with Egaleo, where he made an important 5-year career, both in the first division, as well as in the second division. He finished his career in the team of Marko in 1989.

International career
Outsikas was an international with both the Greece U21 and the Greece U19 teams. In 1977 he played with the Amateur team of Greece in the UEFA Amateur Cup in the qualifying matches against Italy and Austria.

Personal life
His brother, Giannis was also a footballer, who played in the amateur team of AEK in during the late 70's.

Honours

AEK Athens
Alpha Ethniki: 1977–78, 1978–79
Greek Cup: 1977–78

Egaleo
Beta Ethniki: 1982–83

References

1957 births
Living people
Greek footballers
Super League Greece players
AEK Athens F.C. players
Acharnaikos F.C. players
Panachaiki F.C. players
Diagoras F.C. players
Egaleo F.C. players
Association football midfielders
People from Messini